One Life, One Death Cut Up is the second live album by Buck-Tick, released on March 28, 2001. It was recorded at the Nippon Budokan on December 29, 2000, the last track "Kodou" is a bonus track and was recorded on December 16, 2000 at Nagoya Century Hall. It reached number thirty-two on the Oricon chart.

Track listing

Disc One 
 "Thing III"
 "Glamorous"
 "Uta" (唄; Song)
 "Check Up"
 "Sapphire" (サファイア)
 "Down"
 "Asylum Garden"
 "Chaos - Kirameki no Naka de..." (Chaos～キラメキの中で...; Chaos - In the Glitter...)
 "Miu" (ミウ)
 "Cyborg Dolly: Sora-mimi: Phantom" (細胞具ドリー：ソラミミ：Phantom; Cell Tool Dolly: A Phantom Feigning Deafness)
 "Death Wish"

Disc Two 
 "Kain" (カイン; Cain)
 "Megami" (女神; Goddess)
 "Flame"
 "Bran-New Lover"
 "Baby, I Want You."
 "Rhapsody"
 "Dress" (ドレス)
 "Idol"
 "Ash-Ra"
 "Physical Neurose"
 "Kodou" (鼓動; Heartbeat)

References 

2001 live albums
Buck-Tick albums